Nikola Popović (born 31 May 1994) is a Serbian football forward who plays for lithuanian Riteriai Club.

Club career
On 23 February 2023 he signed with lithuanian Riteriai Club.

References

External links
 
 

1994 births
People from Bor, Serbia
Living people
Serbian footballers
Association football forwards
FK Timok players
FK Napredak Kruševac players
FK Kolubara players
FK Dinamo Vranje players
FK BSK Borča players
FK ČSK Čelarevo players
OFK Grbalj players
FK Metalac Gornji Milanovac players
FC Lori players
Serbian SuperLiga players
Serbian First League players
Montenegrin First League players
Armenian Premier League players
Serbian expatriate footballers
Serbian expatriate sportspeople in Montenegro
Expatriate footballers in Montenegro
Serbian expatriate sportspeople in Armenia
Expatriate footballers in Armenia